The 2017 O'Byrne Cup was played by county and further education college teams of Leinster GAA in January 2017 and was won by Dublin.

Format
16 teams compete: 11 county teams (all those of Leinster except Kilkenny) and 5 third-level teams (DIT, UCD, IT Carlow, DCU–Dóchas Éireann and Maynooth University).

The teams are drawn into 4 groups of 4 teams each. Each team plays the other teams in their group once, earning 2 points for a win and 1 for a draw. The four group winners compete in the semi-finals.

Group stage

Group 1

Group 2

Group 3

Meath finished 1st due to their better score difference.

Group 4

Knockout stage

Semi-finals

Final

References

External links

O'Byrne Cup
O'Byrne Cup